Aellopos tantalus, known as the Tantalus sphinx, is a moth of the family Sphingidae. It is found in Florida, the Antilles, from Mexico to Venezuela, Colombia, Ecuador, Suriname, and in the Amazon basin.

The body is reddish brown with a wide white band across the abdomen. The forewing upperside is reddish brown with a black cell spot and three white spots near the gray marginal area. A pale streak runs from the cell spot to the inner margin of the wing. The hindwing upperside is dark brown.

Adults are on wing year-round. The adults feed on nectar of various flowers, including Eugenia axillaris, Draceana fragrans and Ernodea littoralis.

The larvae feed on Rubiaceae species, including Casasia clusiifolia and Randia aculeata. Pupation takes place in loose cocoons in shallow underground chambers or in leaf litter.

Subspecies
Aellopos tantalus tantalus
Aellopos tantalus zonata (Drury, 1773) (St. Kitts and Mexico)

References

External links
"Aellopos tantalus (Linnaeus 1758)". Catalogue of the Lepidoptera of the French Antilles.
"Tantalus sphinx Aellopos tantalus (Linnaeus, 1758)". Butterflies and Moths of North America.

Aellopos
Moths described in 1758
Taxa named by Carl Linnaeus
Moths of North America
Moths of South America